Dayron Armando Varona Suarez (born February 24, 1988) is a Cuban former professional baseball outfielder.

Career
Suarez played for Camagüey in the Cuban National Series (CNS) through 2013, while also playing for the Naranjas de Villa Clara in 2012. He was suspended from CNS play in November 2013 for an attempted defection. He successfully defected from Cuba the next week and signed a minor league contract with the Rays in March 2015. The Rays assigned him to the Charlotte Stone Crabs of the Class A-Advanced Florida State League in May, and was promoted to the Montgomery Biscuits of the Class AA Southern League.

During President Barack Obama's March 2016 visit to Cuba, Varona played for the Rays against the Cuban national team at the Estadio Latinoamericano in Havana. The Rays won the game, and Varona became the first Cuban defector to return to play in Cuba. He played for the Durham Bulls of the Class AAA International League in 2017.

Varona was released by the Rays in 2017. On June 21, Varona signed with the York Revolution of the Atlantic League of Professional Baseball. He became a free agent after the 2017 season.

References

External links

Living people
1988 births
Minor league baseball players
Defecting Cuban baseball players
Naranjas de Villa Clara players
Charlotte Stone Crabs players
Liga de Béisbol Profesional Roberto Clemente outfielders
Montgomery Biscuits players
Durham Bulls players
Criollos de Caguas players
Cuban expatriate baseball players in Puerto Rico
York Revolution players
Ganaderos de Camaguey players
Gigantes de Carolina players
Águilas del Zulia players
Cuban expatriate baseball players in Venezuela
Baseball players from Havana